As a mountainous country, Afghanistan contains countless notable valleys. The majority of the valleys are located in parts of northeastern, central, southern and southeastern Afghanistan. The southeastern areas are wetter and are covered by forest with trees such as cypress, oak, poplar, pine etc.

Northern Hindu Kush mountain valleys 
Wakhan valleys include Sheghnan, Ashava, Darwaz, Drayem, Arsj, Hnjab, Farkhar, Ishkamish District valley, Khost i Fereng, Samandan, Andrab, Khenjan, Tala wa Barfak.

Southern Hindu Kush valleys
Panj Valley, Korm, Panjdarh Nijrab, Bandavol, Eshpi, Shishil, Kepchaq, Chardeh, Sayghan, Kahmard, Salang, Darzab, Panjshir, Ghorband District, Surobi, etc.

Koh-i-Baba mountain valleys 
Koh-i-Baba is located in central Afghanistan and contains the valleys of Koladi, Bamiyan, Kakrak, Turkman and others.

Safēd Kōh mountain valleys 
Valleys include Khyber Pass, Nazyan District, Shinwar District, Achen, Zarmast, Jajy, Khogyani, Kjah, Nakrokhil, Shtowa, Eshyak Hesarak, Ghelzai, Tezhin, Sarobi, Musaly, Sarkhak, Altimur, Charkh Kharwar District, Tangi Wardak, Shnz, Nawagi, Gelga Ghazni, Sholgar, Abband, Dalah, Azkhowah, Teraa, Rqiban, Hassan Khel, Mchal Ghor, Shimal, Nikah, Berkoti etc.

Paghman and central/southern valleys 
Paghman District Mountains are a branch of the Hindu Kush mountains, which formed numerous valleys. Valleys include Parsa, Behisood, Nahur, Malistan, Ghab, Daykundi, Yakawolang, Daizangy, Jaghori, Ajersitan etc. There are many valleys located in the eastern and southern parts of this mountain range such as Shakardara, Gul, Estalf, Gaza, Paghman, Pshahi, Jalriz, Nirkh, Bec Samand, Dayimurad, Khowat, Qyāq, Gulbawri, Kakrak, Torgan, Shaki, Zarsang, Qarabagh, Zard ålu, Tamaki, Rasana, Arghandab, Gizab and others.

Other notable valleys 
Other notable valleys include Korengal Valley in Kunar Province; Dara-I-Pech in Nangarhar Province; Deravod and Sangin in Helmand Province; Darah sof in Samangan Province; Kayhan valley in Baghlan Province; and Charkent in Balkh Province.

See also

Districts of Afghanistan
Geography of Afghanistan

References

 
Lists of landforms of Afghanistan